The siege of Landrecies (1543) took place during the Italian War of 1542–46. Landrecies was besieged by Imperial and English forces under the command of Ferrante Gonzaga.  They were repulsed by the French defenders under the command of Martin du Bellay.

Notes

References

Conflicts in 1543
16th-century military history of the Kingdom of England
Sieges of the Italian Wars
Landrecies (1543)
1543 in France
1543 in Italy
1543 in England
Italian War of 1542–1546